Gilberto Toledano (born 23 August 1946) is a Mexican modern pentathlete. He competed at the 1972 Summer Olympics.

References

External links
 

1946 births
Living people
Mexican male modern pentathletes
Olympic modern pentathletes of Mexico
Modern pentathletes at the 1972 Summer Olympics